Wiebke Muhsal (born 6 April 1986 in Lüdinghausen) is a German politician with the Alternative für Deutschland (AfD). Since 2014, she is a member of the Landtag of Thuringia and deputy chairman of the AfD caucus. She is also her party's critic on family and education policy and is a member of the Parliamentary Committee on Education, Youth and Sports.

Life and education
Muhsal was raised in Münster and Bad Salzuflen. In 2005 she began studying Jurisprudence at the University of Jena, from which in 2012 she graduated with a Diplom-Juristin degree. After completing her studies, she devoted herself primarily to raising her three sons until her election to the Thuringian Landtag in 2014. Muhsal is married and lives in Jena. She is a practising Roman Catholic.

Political engagement 
Muhsal joined the AfD in November 2013. She is the AfD spokeswoman for the Jena-Gera-Saale-Holzland district, and a member of the working group on family, health, and demography as well as leader of the working group on education, science, and culture. After the 2014 state elections in Thuringia, she was elected to the Thuringian Landtag. In July 2015 she was selected as the state representative for the Young Alternative for Germany.

In 2016, Muhsal wearied a Niqab to the Thuringian Landtag (State parliament) in a protest to call for a ban on the face covering.

Positions 
Muhsal is primarily interested in education and family policy. She advocates a marriage loan (Ehekredit) for young couples similar to practises in the former GDR and a basic allowance for children (Baukindergeld). She also argued for the preservation of the state education allowance (Landeserziehungsgeld) and stood for a further developing the family allowance. In March 2015 she was the first signatory to the so-called "Erfurt Resolution".

Waiver of immunity 
In June 2015  at the request of the state prosecutor in Erfurt, the Judiciary Committee of the Thuringian Landtag lifted the parliamentary immunity on Muhsal to enable a criminal investigation against her. A former colleague had alleged she had billed expenses inappropriately. Muhsal denied the allegations and launched a counter-accusation of libel.

Links 
Official biography (in German) at the Landtag of Thuringia.

References 

1986 births
Living people
People from Lüdinghausen
German Roman Catholics
Alternative for Germany politicians
Members of the Landtag of Thuringia
Women members of State Parliaments in Germany
21st-century German women politicians
University of Jena alumni
Female critics of feminism